Mary-Margaret Humes is an American actress. She won the Miss Florida USA pageant and was third runner up in the 1975 Miss USA. Humes later began working as a television actress, appearing in a more than 50 shows, most notable playing Gail Leery, the title character's mother in the WB drama series Dawson's Creek from 1998 to 2003.

Life and career
Humes was born at Mercy Hospital in Watertown, New York. She attended Watertown High School ('72) and competed as Miss Thousand Islands in the 1974 Miss New York State contest. She won the Miss Florida USA pageant and was third runner up in the 1975 Miss USA pageant behind eventual winner and fellow actress Summer Bartholomew of California.

In 1981, Humes made her big screen debut as the Vestal Virgin Miriam in the Mel Brooks's comedy film History of the World, Part I. Later Aaron Spelling cast her for the pilot for the action-adventure series Velvet alongside Leah Ayres, Shari Belafonte, and Sheree J. Wilson. During 1980s, Humes guest-starred in a number of shows, including The Dukes of Hazzard, The Love Boat, The A-Team, The Fall Guy and T.J. Hooker. From 1991 to 1992, she played the mother of lead character in the short-lived NBC series Eerie, Indiana. She starred in the 1992 television movie Perry Mason: The Case of the Reckless Romeo, and later made appearances in Matlock (three times in different roles), Diagnosis: Murder, In the Heat of the Night and Murphy Brown.

From 1998 to 2003, Humes starred as Gail Leery, the mother of title character in the WB drama series Dawson's Creek. After Dawson's Creek, Humes guest-starred in a number of shows, include Grey's Anatomy, CSI: Crime Scene Investigation and Criminal Minds, and appeared in a number of Hallmark Channel television movies.

Filmography

References

External links

Living people
Actresses from New York (state)
American film actresses
American television actresses
Miss USA 1970s delegates
People from Watertown, New York
20th-century American actresses
21st-century American actresses
Year of birth missing (living people)